Neotarache is a monotypic moth genus of the family Noctuidae. Its only species, Neotarache deserticola, is found in the US state of Nevada. Both the genus and species were first described by William Barnes and Foster Hendrickson Benjamin in 1922.

References
 
 

Acontiinae
Monotypic moth genera